

List of channels

 Al Aoula
 Al Aoula HD
 2M TV
 Arryadia
 Arryadia Live HD
 Attakafia
 Attakafia HD
 Al Maghribia
 Al Maghribia HD
 Assadissa HD
 Aflam TV (TNT Only)
 Tamazight TV
 Tamazight HD
 Laayoune TV
 Medi1 TV
 Medi1 TV HD
 Télé maroc
 Chada TV HD
 Al Ons TV
 MBC 5

Morocco